Stefan Kürten (born 1963) is a contemporary German artist who lives and works in Düsseldorf. Known for his intricate paintings of domestic and urban landscapes, Kürten has exhibited extensively since 1984 and his work is held in a number of collections in Europe and the United States.

Life and career 
Stefan Kürten was born in 1963 in Düsseldorf. After studying Philosophy and English at Heinrich Heine University, he enrolled at Kunstakademie Düsseldorf and studied painting with Michael Buthe, receiving his MA in 1989. He then moved to San Francisco, where he studied and taught at the San Francisco Art Institute during the early 1990s. Kürten has since taught at various institutions, such as Hochschule für Künste, Bremen (from 2002-2003), Bauhaus-Universität Weimar (2010), School of Art and Design, Alfred University (2012), and Kunstakademie Düsseldorf (since 2014).

Kürten's paintings depict natural and built environments or interiors while often incorporating decorative or ornamental motifs culled from wallpaper and textile design. Devoid of any human presence, Kürten's work typically showcases spaces and buildings marked by daily life and use but seemingly abandoned or vacated, in many cases allowing plants and natural life to encroach and overtake the space. However, he rejects a strictly futuristic or prophetic reading of his work; in a conversation with Lawrence R. Rinder, director of BAM/PFA, he speaks to the hauntological nature of his paintings: "It is more concerned with the present, the way we feel and experience ourselves and our environments now, and of course the past, as we access our memories be they 'true' or 'false.' The futuristic quality in my images is something from the future, but it's a future from the past, an optimism laden with bright promises and bedeviled by moral imperatives."

Alongside his career in painting, Kürten also makes music under his own name and with the band Elena Farr, and played guitar in the group Superbilk from 1995 to 1999.

Selected exhibitions

Selected solo exhibitions 

 2017: Through the mirror, NextLevel Galerie, Paris
 2014-15: Heimlich, Galerie der Stadt Backnang, Backnang, Germany
 2012-13: Come on home-Arbeiten auf Papier, Kunstmuseum Mülheim an der Ruhr
 2010: Darker with the Day, Parkhaus im Malkasten, Düsseldorf
 2008: Always, Künstlerverein Malkasten, Düsseldorf
 2007: Shadowtime, Museum Haus Esters, Krefeld; Royal Hibernian Academy, Dublin
 2005: Say Hello, Wave Goodbye, Thomas Dane, Ltd., London
 2003: The Nearest Thing to Heaven, Museum im Kulturspeicher Würzburg
 2002: Perfect Day, Alexander and Bonin, New York
 2001: In einem anderen Land, an einem anderen Ort, Galerie Michael Cosar, Düsseldorf
 1998: Die Lüge der Erinnerung/The Lie of Memory, Hosfelt Gallery, San Francisco
 1998: Different Worlds, Goethe-Institut, Hong Kong 
 1996: Aus Wiedersehen Bielefeld, Galerie Raab, Berlin
 1993: Das ABC des Lebens, Kulturforum Alte Post, Neuss, Germany
 1993: Dietmar Werle, Cologne
 1993: Life Cycles, Artspace, San Francisco
 1991: The Diversity of Life, Dorothy Goldeen Gallery, Los Angeles
 1991: Aschenbach Galerie, Amsterdam
 1990: One Thousand and One Mornings, Rena Bransten Gallery, San Francisco
 1989: Matrix 131: Stefan Kürten, Berkeley Art Museum, Berkeley, CA
 1988: Galerie Ute Parduhn, Düsseldorf
 1984: Fun Gallery, San Francisco

Selected group exhibitions 

 2016-17: The Adventure of our Collection I, Kaiser Wilhelm Museum, Krefeld
 2013: La Peintre de la Vie Moderne, Galerie Jochen Hempel, Leipzig, Germany
 2011-12: Gesamtkunstwerk, New Art From Germany, Saatchi Gallery, London
 2010: Optical Shift – Illusion und Täuschung / Illusion and Deception, B-05 Kunst und Kulturzentrum, Montabaur
 2010: Collecting the New, Irish Museum of Modern Art, Dublin
 2007-08: Garten Eden: Der Garten in der Kunst seit 1900, Kunsthalle Emden
 2007: Early Retirement, Mai 36 Galerie, Zürich
 2007: Die Kunst zu sammeln, Museum Kunstpalast, Düsseldorf
 2005: Le peintre de la vie moderne/De schilder van het moderene leven/The Painter of Modern Life, Museum De Paviljoens, Almere, Netherlands
 2004: Come back in one piece, Galerie Anna Klinkhammer, Düsseldorf
 2000: Of the Moment, San Francisco Museum of Modern Art
 2000: Extraordinary Reality, Columbus Museum of Art, OH
 1995: New Acquisitions, Berkeley Art Museum and Pacific Film Archive, Berkeley, CA
 1994: On Paper, The Drawing Room, Amsterdam
 1985: Perspektiven 3, Kunstverein Düsseldorf

Selected collections 
 Berkeley Art Museum and Pacific Film Archive, Berkeley, CA
 Birmingham Museum of Art, AL
 The Irish Museum of Modern Art, Dublin
 Artothek, Wilhelm-Lehmbruck-Museum, Duisburg
 Stiftung Museum Kunst Palast, Düsseldorf
 Kunsthalle in Emden
 Herbert F. Johnson Museum of Art, Cornell University, Ithaca, NY
 Knoxville Museum of Art, TN
 Kunstmuseen Krefeld
 Los Angeles County Museum of Art, Los Angeles
 Montreal Museum of Fine Arts
 Kunstmuseum Mülheim an der Ruhr
 Clemens Sels Museum, Neuss
 Museum of Modern Art, New York
 New York Public Library, New York
 San Francisco Museum of Modern Art

Selected bibliography 
 Shick, Martin and Simone Scholten, Eds. Running to Stand Still: Stefan Kürten. ex cat. Stadt Backnang: VG Bild-Kunst, Bonn, 2015 
 Zybok, Oliver, ed. Here Comes the Night. Works on Paper 2009–2013, ex. cat. Ostfildern: Hatje Cantz, 2013 
 Hentschel, Martin. Stefan Kürten, Black Mirror, Drucke/Prints 1991-2009; Bielefeld, Kerber Verlag, 2010 
 Thomas, Elizabeth. Matrix / Berkeley, A changing exhibition of Contemporary Art. University of California. Berkeley Art Museum and Pacific Film Archive 
 Hentschel, Martin, Ed. Shadowtime, ex. cat. Krefeld: Kunstmuseum Krefeld; Dublin: Royal Hibernian Academy; Bielefeld: Kerber Verlag, 2007 
 Kürten, Stefan and Rebecca Solnit. Inside Out. San Francisco: Artspace Books, 2006 
 Frankel, David and David Gray. Stefan Kürten: Blue days, black nights. New York: Alexander and Bonin; San Francisco: Hosfelt Gallery; Düsseldorf: Galerie Michael Cosar, Galerie Ute Parduhn, 2004
 Reese, Beate. Stefan Kürten (translated by Julia Thorson). Würzburg: Museum in Kulturspeicher, 2003
 McCormick, Carlo, Jens-Peter Koerver, Lawrence Rinder. Stefan Kürten: Every day is like Sunday.  Düsseldorf: Galerie Michael Cosar, Galerie Ute Parduhn; San Francisco: Todd Hosfelt Gallery, 2001

References

External links 
 Official Website

German contemporary artists
1963 births
Kunstakademie Düsseldorf alumni
Academic staff of Kunstakademie Düsseldorf
20th-century German painters
20th-century German male artists
21st-century German painters
21st-century German male artists
Living people